Edgar Hughes "Blue" Washington (26 February 1898 – 15 September 1970) was an American actor and baseball player who played in the Negro leagues from 1915 to 1920 as a pitcher and first baseman.

Baseball career
Washington started his baseball career as a pitcher with the Chicago American Giants in 1915. He remained with Chicago in 1916. He later played with the Kansas City Monarchs in 1920, appearing in 24 documented major league games.

Acting career
He appeared in 74 films between 1919 and 1957, mostly playing small, uncredited roles as a porter, a bartender, an African native (as in King Kong (1933) and Tarzan's Magic Fountain (1949), a cook, a chauffeur, a ship's crew member, a Nubian slave, and a doorman. Some of his characters had names such as "Ulambo", "Sambo" (sambo) and "Hambone". In the 1933 film Haunted Gold, he portrayed Clarence, John Wayne's comic sidekick. He had uncredited appearances in Birth of a Nation (1915) and Gone with the Wind (1939).

Personal
Washington was the son of Susie Washington and had three siblings. He became a boxer at age 14 with the stage name of "Kid Blue." His separated from his partner Marian Lenàn when their son Kenny was two years old.

He was given the nickname "Blue" by film director Frank Capra when both were kids. Washington's son, Kenny Washington, a standout athlete at UCLA where he was a teammate of Jackie Robinson, broke the color barrier in the National Football League in 1946.

Filmography

 Haunted Spooks (1920, Short) as Butler (film debut) (uncredited)
 A Virginia Courtship (1921)
 The Blood Ship (1927) as Minor Role
 By Whose Hand? (1927) as Eli
 The Haunted Ship (1927) as Mose
 The Smart Set (1928) as Polo Fan (uncredited)
 Wyoming (1928) as Mose
 Ransom (1928) as Oliver
 Beggars of Life (1928) as Black Mose
 Do Your Duty (1928) as Dude Jackson
 The Passion Song (1928) as Ulambo
 The Phantom City (1928) as 'Blue'
 Weary River (1929) as Prisoner in Bathtub (uncredited)
 Black Magic (1929) as Unit
 Hallelujah (1929) as Church Member (uncredited)
 Rio Rita (1929) as Fremont Bank Robber (uncredited)
 Welcome Danger (1929) as Thorne's Black Henchman (uncredited)
 Parade of the West (1930) as Sambo
 Lucky Larkin (1930) as Hambone
 Mountain Justice (1930) as Mose (uncredited)
 The Cohens and the Kellys in Africa (1930) as Native Golf Champion (uncredited)
 Desert Vengeance (1931) as Train Porter (uncredited)
 Kiki (1931) (uncredited)
 Guilty Hands (1931) as Johnny (uncredited)
 Haunted Gold (1932) as Clarence
 King Kong (1933) as Warrior (uncredited)
 King of the Arena (1933) as Sambo (uncredited)
 Her Bodyguard (1933) as Chauffeur (uncredited)
 One Year Later (1933) as Train Porter (uncredited)
 Goodbye Love (1933) as Jail Steward (uncredited)
 Roman Scandals (1933) as Litter Bearer (uncredited)
 Belle of the Nineties (1934) as Doorman at Sensation House (uncredited)
 Menace (1934) as Kenya Manservant (uncredited)
 The Whole Town's Talking (1935) as Bank Doorman (uncredited)
 The Crusades (1935) as One of Saladin's Guards (uncredited)
 The Virginia Judge (1935) as 1st Black Man (uncredited)
 Annie Oakley (1935) as Cook (uncredited)
 Escape from Devil's Island (1935) as Convict (uncredited)
 The Prisoner of Shark Island (1936) as Black Soldier at Prison (uncredited)
 The Plainsman (1936) as Black Man Dropping Box (uncredited)
 White Hunter (1936) as Minor Role (uncredited)
 Nancy Steele Is Missing! (1937) as Convict (uncredited)
 Souls at Sea (1937) as Ship Slave (uncredited)
 Charlie Chan on Broadway (1937) as Doorman at Hottentot Club (uncredited)
 Ali Baba Goes to Town (1937) as Arab (uncredited)
 Wells Fargo (1937) as Sam - Coachman (uncredited)
 Tarzan's Revenge (1938) as Bearer Bringing Olaf Poison Darts (uncredited)
 Over the Wall (1938) as Convict Playing Guitar (uncredited)
 Too Hot to Handle (1938) as Native (uncredited)
 The Cowboy and the Lady (1938) as Dock Worker (uncredited)
 Kentucky (1938) as Bill (uncredited)
 Charlie Chan in Honolulu (1939) as Crewman (uncredited)
 Twelve Crowded Hours (1939) as First Bartender (uncredited)
 Rose of Washington Square (1939) as Prisoner (uncredited)
 Charlie Chan in Reno (1939) as Man in Line-Up (uncredited)
 Way Down South (1939) as Slave (uncredited)
 Gone with the Wind (1939) as Renegade's Companion (uncredited)
 The Light That Failed (1939) as Bit Part (uncredited)
 The Long Voyage Home (1940) as Black Cook on Glencairn (uncredited)
 A Girl, a Guy and a Gob (1941) as Opera House Doorman (uncredited)
 Sundown (1941) as Askari Veteran (uncredited)
 Lady for a Night (1942) as Man Sitting Next to Chloe (uncredited)
 Law of the Jungle (1942) as Native (uncredited)
 Drums of the Congo (1942) as Native Bearer (uncredited)
 It Happened in Flatbush (1942) as Courtroom Spectator (uncredited)
 Tales of Manhattan (1942) as Shantytown Man (Robeson sequence) (uncredited)
 Road to Morocco (1942) as Nubian Slave (uncredited)
 To the Ends of the Earth (1948) as Binda Sha Henchman (uncredited)
 Tarzan's Magic Fountain (1949) as Native Bearer (uncredited)
 Africa Screams (1949) as Native (uncredited)
 Bomba, the Jungle Boy (1949) as Native Bearer (uncredited)
 Pinky (1949) as Minor Role (uncredited)
 Tarzan and the Slave Girl (1950) as Randini Bearer Shot by Arrow (uncredited)
 I Was a Communist for the FBI (1951) as Black Man at Union Meeting (uncredited)
 Angels in the Outfield (1951) as Doorman (uncredited)
 Golden Girl (1951) as Lola's Coachman (uncredited)
 Stars and Stripes Forever (1952) as Crowd Spectator (uncredited)
 Siren of Bagdad (1953) as Palace Servant (uncredited)
 The Kid from Left Field (1953) as Train Station Porter (uncredited)
 The Wings of Eagles (1957) as Bartender at Officer's Club (uncredited)
 The Hustler (1961) as Limping Attendant at Ames Billiards (final film) (uncredited)

References

Sources

External links
 
 and Seamheads

1898 births
1970 deaths
American male film actors
American male silent film actors
20th-century American male actors
African-American male actors
Chicago American Giants players
Kansas City Monarchs players
20th-century African-American sportspeople